The 2000 Espirito Santo Trophy took place 23–26 August at Sporting Club Berlin, on its Nick Faldo Course, in Bad Saarow, outside Berlin, Germany.

It was the 19th women's golf World Amateur Team Championship for the Espirito Santo Trophy.

The tournament was a 72-hole stroke play team event. There were a record 40 team entries, each with three players. The best two scores for each round counted towards the team total.

The French team won the Trophy for their second title, their first since France won the inaugural event on home soil in 1964. They beat team South Korea by seven strokes. South Korea took the silver, while the combined team of Great Britain and Ireland took the bronze on third place another four strokes back. The defending United States team finished 17th, their worst finish ever in the championship, having won the trophy 13 times.

The individual title went to Suzann Pettersen, Norway, whose score of 3-under-par, 285, was four strokes ahead of the nearest competitors.

Teams 
40 teams entered the event and completed the competition. Each team had three players.

Results 

Sources:

Individual leaders 
There was no official recognition for the lowest individual scores.

References

External links 
World Amateur Team Championships on International Golf Federation website

Espirito Santo Trophy
Golf tournaments in Germany
Espirito Santo Trophy
Espirito Santo Trophy
Espirito Santo Trophy